Nikolaos Ioannidis (born 28 May 1960) is a Greek rower. He competed in the men's coxless pair event at the 1980 Summer Olympics.

References

1960 births
Living people
Greek male rowers
Olympic rowers of Greece
Rowers at the 1980 Summer Olympics
Place of birth missing (living people)